The Honey Pot, also known as The Honeypot, is a 1967 American crime comedy-drama film written for the screen and directed by Joseph L. Mankiewicz. It stars Rex Harrison, Susan Hayward, Cliff Robertson, Capucine, Edie Adams, and Maggie Smith. The film was based on the play Mr. Fox of Venice by Frederick Knott, the novel The Evil of the Day by Thomas Sterling, and loosely on the 1606 play Volpone by Ben Jonson.

Plot

The film is set in Venice as a contemporary tale.

Struggling actor William McFly (Cliff Robertson) is hired by wealthy Cecil Fox (Rex Harrison) to play his personal secretary for a practical joke. Pretending to be on his deathbed, Fox invites three former lovers to his Venetian palazzo for a final visit: penniless Princess Dominique (Capucine), fading movie star Merle McGill (Edie Adams), and Texas millionairess Mrs. Lone Star Crockett Sheridan (Susan Hayward). Accompanying Mrs. Sheridan is her nurse, Sarah Watkins (Maggie Smith). By chance, each of the women brings Fox a timepiece as a present.

The three women warily size each other up. Mrs. Sheridan boldly announces that the others might as well go home, as she is Fox's common-law wife, and they can expect to inherit nothing. However, when Sarah returns from a late-night date with McFly, she finds her employer Sheridan dead of an overdose of sleeping pills, an apparent suicide. Police Inspector Rizzi (Adolfo Celi) investigates.

Sarah knows that the pills Mrs. Sheridan had been taking are harmless fakes. McFly has already revealed to Sarah that Fox is perpetrating a charade, and that the final joke is to be the reading of the will, empowering McFly to choose the heir. She therefore suspects him not only of being the murderer, but also plotting to kill Fox. When she confronts McFly, he locks her in her room, telling her it is for her own safety. She manages to escape via a dumbwaiter and warns Fox. However, his displeased reaction puzzles her. He sends her back to her room.

The next morning, Fox is found dead. McFly reveals that Fox was the killer of Sarah's employer. He was broke and wanted Mrs. Sheridan's fortune. Once McFly had figured it out (and more importantly, told Sarah), Fox realized it was all up and committed suicide. Fox's spirit continues in the film as a voice over.

Sarah asks McFly to write her name down in the will as the heir of Fox's worthless estate as a souvenir, with Rizzi signing as a witness. After McFly complies, an amused Rizzi compliments him on his "generosity"—while Fox may have been deeply in debt, Mrs. Sheridan's estate is so vast, Sarah will still emerge an extremely wealthy woman. She informs McFly that she will marry him and hand over the money once he resumes his law studies and becomes a lawyer.

Cast

Rex Harrison as Cecil Sheridan Fox
Susan Hayward as Mrs. Lone Star Crockett Sheridan
Cliff Robertson as William McFly

Capucine as Princess Dominique
Edie Adams as Merle McGill

Maggie Smith as Sarah Watkins

Adolfo Celi as Inspector Rizzi
Hugh Manning as Volpone
David Dodimead as Mosca

Anne Bancroft originally was offered the role of Merle McGill, but she chose instead to star in Michael Cacoyannis' Broadway staging of John Whiting's The Devils.

Production
It was originally called The Tale of the Fox.

The film was shot on location in Venice and in the Cinecittà studios in Rome. In Venice, Palazzo Soranzo Van Axel was featured in the movie.

Reception

Critical Response 
On Rotten Tomatoes the film has an approval rating of 57% based on reviews from 7 critics. 

Variety called The Honey Pot "a rich confection in every department" praising both cast and crew, but it found the film's pace too slow and wondered whether "its hark-back to the days when the turn of phrase and the tongue-in-cheek were a staple" would weaken its appeal for contemporary audiences who preferred "Bondian brashness" to Mankiewicz's "innuendo." Boxoffice also criticized the film's length, but welcomed Mankiewicz's witty style, calling The Honey Pot  "one of the most sophisticated and stylish pictures to come along in several seasons...Welcome back, Mr. Mankiewicz!" British film critic, Graham Clarke, gave the film a favorable review in the Kinematograph Weekly, writing: "It is so full of cunningly contrived intricacies, of cynical, witty and serious dialogue and of boldly presented renaissance flamboyance."

DVD
The Honey Pot was released to DVD by MGM Home Video on January 15, 2011, via its MGM MOD (manufacture-on-demand) service available through Amazon.

See also
List of American films of 1967

References

External links
 
 
 

1967 films
1967 comedy-drama films
American comedy-drama films
American films based on plays
Films directed by Joseph L. Mankiewicz
Films scored by John Addison
Films set in Venice
United Artists films
Films based on multiple works
Films with screenplays by Joseph L. Mankiewicz
1960s English-language films
Works based on Volpone
1960s American films
English-language comedy-drama films